Guankou may refer to:

Talk strings, oral technique used in xiangsheng performances

Places in China
Guankou, Fujian, in Jimei District, Xiamen, Fujian
Guankou, Hubei, in Xishui County, Hubei
Guankou, Shaanxi, in Xunyang, Shaanxi 
Guankou Subdistrict, Liuyang, Hunan
Guankou Subdistrict, Dujiangyan, Sichuan